The Bill Knight Trophy is an annual trophy given to the Most Outstanding Player of the Colonial Clash, a college football rivalry game played between the Minutemen of the University of Massachusetts Amherst and the Wildcats of the University of New Hampshire. A new trophy is cast each year, therefore allowing the honoree to keep his award permanently.

History
The award is named after Bill Knight, long-time Sports Information Director at the University of New Hampshire, who died in November 1985. In addition to his duties at UNH, Knight was a past President of the New England Sports Information Directors Association, a member of the U.S. Olympic Committee at the 1984 Winter Games, and a recipient of the Irving T. Marsh ECAC Service Bureau Award. He also served as the Information Officer of the Yankee Conference. Knight was inducted into the University of New Hampshire 100 Club Hall of Fame on October 2, 1987. First awarded to Tim Bryant of UMass in 1986, the Bill Knight Trophy has been given to the most outstanding player of each playing of the Colonial Clash since then.

Recipients

See also
 List of NCAA college football rivalry games

Notes
Quarterbacks won the first seven awards. No quarterback has won since.
No player from the losing team has been awarded the trophy.
Four Bill Knight Trophy winners have gone on to play in the NFL: Jerry Azumah, Marcel Shipp, Steve Baylark, and Matt Lawrence.

References

College football rivalry trophies in the United States
UMass Minutemen football
New Hampshire Wildcats football